Urik  is a rural locality (a selo) in Irkutsky District of Irkutsk Oblast, Russia, located approximately  from Irkutsk. The population was 2,184 as of 2012.

It is named after the Urik River. Founded in 1673, it is the oldest rural locality in Irkutsky District. Several Decembrists, including Michael Lunin and Nikita Muravyov, were exiled to Urik.

External links
Official website of Urikovskoye Rural Settlement

References

Rural localities in Irkutsk Oblast
Populated places established in 1673
1673 establishments in Russia
Irkutsk Governorate